This is the list of roads in Multan.

Along with Motorways

Other populated roads

See also
 List of places in Multan

External links
 Portal of Multan City

Transport in Multan
Multan
Multan-related lists